The Entoliidae, also referred to as the entoliids, are a taxonomic family of saltwater clams, marine bivalve mollusks in the order Pectinida. They are related to and are considered the ancestors of modern scallops. In the geological record the family contains at least seven species in five different genera, though only one is extant and it is very rare and cryptic, inhabiting the Caribbean and central west Pacific Ocean in small, disjointed populations.

A significant morphological feature lacking in the entoliids but present in modern scallops is the ctenolium, a comb-like structure under the anterior auricle through which scallops are able to produce a byssal thread for attachment to a substrate.  The entoliids did not/ do not secrete a byssal thread.

Genera and species
Genera and species within the family Entoliidae include:
 Entolium Meek 1865
 Entolium fossatum Marwick 1953
 Entolium utokokense Imlay 1961
 Pectinella
 Pectinella sigsbeei (Dall, 1886) 
 Pectinella aequoris Dijkstra, 1991
 Pernopecten Winchell 1865
 Somapecten
 Syncyclonema Meek 1864
 Syncyclonema travisanus Stephenson 1941

References

 
Bivalve families